Sexxx is a British comedy television series, which airs on a Tuesday night. The programme was launched on 27 November 2012 and consists of seven episodes, and was written by Paul Chaplin. The premise of the show is that of a sitcom based in a Soho sex shop run by former porn star Ben Dover as the senior partner, played by Lyndsay Honey, with his best friend 'Pauly', played by Chaplin, as his younger and more naive colleague.  The theme is loosely based upon the 1970s Open All Hours BBC comedy series. Sexxx is broadcast on satellite television and online.

Cast

 Lyndsay Honey as Ben Dover
 Paul Chaplin as Pauly Perkins
 Lyna Korenell as Katia Radek
 Anne Marie Davies	as Liza Baker
 Eileen Daly as Miss Kitty
 Grant Huggair as Jez Butcher
 Emma Burdett as Julia Myers 	
 Nick Orchard as Inspector Trent 	
 Dean Kilbey as Toby Jackson

Episodes

References 

 Article in the Liverpool Echo
 Features Exec
 The Free Library.com

External links 
 
 

2012 British television series debuts
English-language television shows
Loaded TV original programming